Windows Live Barcode (codenamed Confucius) was a part of Microsoft's Windows Live services. It allowed users to transfer information between various media (PCs, billboards, magazines etc.) and handsets via Quick Response Code (QR Code), a two-dimensional matrix barcode. It provided a method for people to exchange information and use various online services on handsets.

Windows Live Barcode aimed to enhance mobile handset utility and provide users with more convenience and flexibility. It was to be integrated with the Windows Mobile platform.

The Windows Live Barcode service consists of two elements:
 Online tools to generate barcodes for business contact cards or personal messages (450 character limit)
 A mobile scanning application to read QR codes into a Windows Mobile handset

Barcodes generated are saved as PNG images.

Features
 Encode text information such as news, notes and URLs into a QR Code and transfer onto a mobile handset
 Transfer information from traditional business card to a mobile handset by taking a snapshot via the Windows Live Barcode application
 Save the digital business card on the mobile handset's address book and allow the ability to manage contacts digitally
 Search and edit specific contact business cards scanned via Windows Live Barcode application

Windows Live Confucius
Windows Live Barcode was shortly taken offline following its beta launch in October 2006. In August 2007, an offshoot of Windows Live Barcode named Windows Live Confucius was launched. Windows Live Confucius, similar to Windows Live Barcode, allowed users to create QR Codes online from a web browser. In addition, Windows Live Confucius also allowed users to create QR Codes using an offline Windows application from their desktop, named Desktop QR Code generator. Together with the launch of Desktop QR Code generator, the QR Reader client was released as well for users to view QR codes on their Windows Mobile devices.

The Desktop QR Code generator can generate QR Code for any text, vCard, calendar and URL information. The QR Reader client, although designed for Windows Mobile devices, has only been tested on the Dopod and not any other Windows Mobile devices.

Successor
Microsoft Tag serves as successor to the concept of Windows Live Barcode.

See also
 Windows Live
 Windows Live Mobile
 Semacode

References

External links
LiveSide.net's Windows Live Barcode article - 
Windows Live Barcode (currently unavailable)

Barcode